The O'Day 302 is an American sailboat that was designed by C. Raymond Hunt Associates as a cruiser and first built in 1988.

Production
The design was built by the O'Day Corporation, a division of Bangor Punta, in the United States, from 1988 to 1989, but it is now out of production. The design was one of the last put into production by O'Day before it went out of business in 1989. The molds were sold to Cal Yachts/Pearson Yachts and a few more boats were completed before the molds were moved to an O'Day affiliate in Japan.

Design

The O'Day 302 is a recreational keelboat, built predominantly of fiberglass. It has a masthead sloop rig, with a fully-battened mainsail, a raked stem, a reverse transom, an internally mounted spade-type rudder controlled by a wheel and a fixed wing keel. It displaces  and carries  of ballast.

The design has sleeping accommodation for six people, with a double "V"-berth in the bow cabin, two settees in the main cabin and an aft cabin with a double berth. The galley is located on the port side just forward of the companionway ladder. The galley is equipped with a two-burner propane stove and a sink with pressurized hot and cold water. The head includes a sink and vanity.

Operational history
A 1987 review in Motor Boating and Sailing reported, "large sweeping expanses of plexiglas and a half dozen opening hatches and ports give the new O'Day 302 a bright, airy interior. To give the boat better performance O'Day added a new, patented winged keel which is said to provide a smoother, more comfortable ride in a seaway. And the 302 also comes equipped with a filly battened  mainsail which is less sensitive to trim, and holds its shape better in light air."

See also
List of sailing boat types

References

External links

Keelboats
Dinghies
1980s sailboat type designs
Sailing yachts
Sailboat type designs by C. Raymond Hunt Associates
Sailboat types built by O'Day Corp.